For more coverage of cricket, go to the Cricket portal.

England in Australia 1901/2

 
This was the last privately run England tour of Australia. The Melbourne Cricket Club invited MCC to send a side, but they declined. Archie MacLaren was therefore invited instead, and accepted. George Hirst, Wilfred Rhodes, KS Ranjitsinjhi, Stanley Jackson and CB Fry were not available. Maclaren's great coup was to select Sydney Barnes, who had been playing in the Lancashire League and had played only a handful of games for Lancashire.

Match length: Timeless. Balls per over: 6. Series result: Australia won 4–1.

Australia in England 1902

Match length: 3 days. Balls per over: 6. Series result: Australia won 2–1.

Australia in South Africa 1902/3

Match length: 3 days. Balls per over: 6. Series result: Australia won 2–0.

England in Australia 1903/4

 
This was the first touring party to be selected and managed by MCC.

Match length: Timeless. Balls per over: 6. Series result: England won 3–2.

Australia in England 1905

Match length: 3 days. Balls per over: 6. Series result: England won 2–0.

England in South Africa 1905/6

Match length: 4 days. Balls per over: 6. Series result: South Africa won 4–1.

South Africa in England 1907

Match length: 3 days. Balls per over: 6. Series result: England won 1–0.

England in Australia 1907/8

Match length: Timeless. Balls per over: 6. Series result: Australia won 4–1.

Australia in England 1909

Match length: 3 days. Balls per over: 6. Series result: Australia won 2–1.

England in South Africa 1909/10

Match length: 5 days. Balls per over: 6. Series result: South Africa won 3–2.

South Africa in Australia 1910/11

Match length: Timeless. Balls per over: 6. Series result: Australia won 4–1.

England in Australia 1911/12

Match length: Timeless. Balls per over: 6. Series result: England won 4–1.

Triangular tournament: Australia and South Africa in 1912

Match length: 3 days (except last game: Timeless). Balls per over: 6. Series result: England won the triangular tournament.

England in South Africa 1913/4

Match length: 4 days. Balls per over: 6. Series result: England won 4–0.

Notes

History of Test cricket